Sir Fineen O'Driscoll (died 1629) was an Irish lord who was knighted by Queen Elizabeth I. He was more commonly known as The Rover and also known as Fineen of the Ships. He was married to Eileen, daughter of Sir Owen MacCarthy Reagh the 16th Prince of Carbery, whose grandmother Eleanor was a daughter of Gearóid Mór FitzGerald, 8th Earl of Kildare. His eldest son, Connor (or Conor), was the owner of Castlehaven. His daughter Eileen married Richard Coppinger, a brother of Sir Walter Coppinger with whom he had numerous disputes over land that continued up to O'Driscoll's death. Another son Fineen was born in 1585. His daughter Mary was captured by a pirate and slaver named Ali Krussa. He also had an illegitimate son, Gilly Duff (or Gilly Dubh, also known as Black Gilly Duff). Fineen was also brother-in-law to Donal II O'Donovan and the two together with Owen MacCarthy Reagh's family are all noted in collaboration on numerous occasions. 

Sir Fineen died in 1629 in his castle, An Clochán, on the island in Loch Ine (Lough Hyne).

The O'Driscolls were a rich and powerful family and their territory stretched over much of south Cork, from Cape Clear and the nearby islands, through Baltimore to Castlehaven. Much of their wealth was attributed to "black rent", a due paid to them by fishermen for the use of their harbours and bays for fishing and salting herring.

References

1629 deaths
People from County Cork
17th-century Irish people
Year of birth unknown